The 124th Pennsylvania House of Representatives District is located in Berks County and Schuylkill County and includes the following areas:

 Berks County
 Albany Township
 Greenwich Township
 Maxatawny Township
 Hamburg
 Kutztown
 Lenhartsville
 Tilden Township
 Upper Bern Township
 Upper Tulpehocken Township
 Windsor Township
 Schuylkill County
 Auburn
 Coaldale
 Deer Lake
 Delano Township
 East Brunswick Township
 Landingville
 New Ringgold
 Orwigsburg
 Port Clinton
 Rush Township
 Schuylkill County (continued)
 Ryan Township
 Schuylkill Township
 South Manheim Township
 Tamaqua
 Walker Township
 West Brunswick Township
 West Penn Township

Representatives

References

Government of Berks County, Pennsylvania
Government of Carbon County, Pennsylvania
Government of Schuylkill County, Pennsylvania
124